Peggy George (born Margaret George de Mille; c. 1908 – 1978) was an American film actress from the silent movie era.

Biography
She was the daughter of William C. de Mille and Anna Angela George, whose father was notable economist Henry George. Her older sister was choreographer Agnes de Mille. Her father, William, was the older brother of noted film director Cecil B. DeMille.

George married producer B. P. Fineman on September 10, 1930. The couple had one daughter, named Judith; and divorced in 1937. Subsequently, she was married to one Richard Miller. She died in 1978.

As a member of the DeMille family of presumed interest to the tabloids, Peggy George is name-dropped in the 1931 film Five Star Final.

Filmography
 The Heart of Nora Flynn (1916)

References

External links
 

1900s births
1978 deaths
Peggy George
American people of German-Jewish descent
American silent film actresses
20th-century American actresses